Eva Kurfürstová (born August 30, 1977, in Karviná, Czechoslovakia (now Czech Republic)) is a Czech alpine skier, a specialist of Slalom and Giant Slalom. Kurfürstová has appeared in two Winter Olympics (2002 and 2006), and at every World Championship since 1996.

Career

Olympic Games
 Giant Slalom - 23rd
 Slalom - 21st
 Slalom - 28th

World Championship finishes
1997 - Ladies Slalom, 32nd position
1999 - Ladies Giant Slalom, 28th position
2001 - Ladies Slalom, 18th position
2003 - Ladies Slalom, 28th position

World Cup
She made her World Cup debut in the end of year 1995 in Haus im Ennstal, and since this date her best result in 20th, on 9 December 2007 in Aspen.

References

External links
 
 
 

1977 births
Living people
Czech female alpine skiers
Alpine skiers at the 2002 Winter Olympics
Alpine skiers at the 2006 Winter Olympics
Olympic alpine skiers of the Czech Republic
Sportspeople from Karviná